Alfonso Wong (27 May 1923 – 1 January 2017), also known by his pen name Wong Chak, was a Hong Kong manhua artist who created one of the longest-running comic strips, Old Master Q, that became popular across Asia.

Biography
Wong was born in Tianjin, Republic of China. He studied Western art at Fu Jen Catholic University, then based in Beijing and finished school by 1944. In 1956, he moved south to British Hong Kong. He was responsible for drawings in Bibles for a French Catholic missionary in the colony and also became the art editor for Hong Kong Catholic magazine, Lok Fung Pao.

Wong became well known in 1961 when he made the manhua Old Master Q. The comic was one of the most influential pieces of work in Hong Kong under British rule before it was transferred back to China, and was popular across Asia. It voiced the opinions of the citizens in an exaggerated comical sense at a time when comics avoided controversial political issues. From integration with mainlanders to the education gap, there were few limitations being broached by the sensitive subjects which accompanied his stories. The comic became known for maintaining popularity for over 40 years against endless competition with other Hong Kong manhua and Japanese manga. Later adaptations into movies, Chinese animation and other works of fiction continued well after his retirement. He later emigrated to the United States and retired by the mid-1990s.

In an exhibition showcasing Wong, the Hong Kong Arts Centre called his work, "a collective memory of Chinese-speaking communities around the world." Original pieces of Wong's work have been exhibited by both Sotheby's and Christie's auction houses.

Personal life
Wong was ambidextrous (i.e. capable of drawing with both hands)  and particularly enjoyed drawing fish. He used his eldest son's name Wong Chak as a pen-name and relinquished the comic to him in 1995. Wong died of organ failure on 1 January 2017, at the age of 93.

He is also the son of the ethnic-Manchu Chinese warlord Wang Chengbin.

References

External links

Official Old Master Q Website Background of Alfonso Wong
The Life of Wong Chak (Chinese)
 Lambiek Comiclopedia entry

Yellow Bus
Chinese comics artists
Chinese comics writers
Chinese animators
Chinese animated film directors
Chinese animated film producers
Fu Jen Catholic University alumni
1923 births
2017 deaths
Hong Kong comics writers
Artists from Tianjin
Writers from Tianjin
Manchu people
People involved in plagiarism controversies